Israel–Seychelles relations are the bilateral relations between the State of Israel and the Republic of Seychelles. The Israeli embassy in Nairobi, Kenya is accredited to Seychelles. Seychelles has an honorary consul in Tel Aviv, named Arie Goldstein.

Overview 
The relations between the State of Israel and the Republic of Seychelles were officially established in 1992, after the end of the boycott of the Sub-Saharan African countries.

The economic relations between Israel and Seychelles are small and modest, with tourism as the most important co-operation between the countries. In 2020, during the COVID-19 pandemic, Seychelles has opened the country for Israelis only, since the fact that during the first wave, Israel was a safe country with low rate of infection.

References 

Seychelles
Bilateral relations of Seychelles